Benjamin Mokulu Tembe (born 11 October 1989) is a professional footballer who plays as a forward for Serie D club United Riccione. Born in Belgium, he has represented the DR Congo national team.

Club career
In January 2019, he joined Juventus U23 on loan.

After the end of the 2018–19 season, he was bought by Juventus. On 16 July 2019, he moved to Padova on a two-year contract. On 24 January 2020, he joined Ravenna on loan. On 3 September 2020, he returned to Ravenna on a season-long loan.

On 30 September 2021, Mokulu was suspended by a year for doping.

On January 2022, he joined Luxembourg club Swift Hesperange. In September 2022, he returned in Italy to play with Serie D club Trapani. On 1 December 2022, Mokulu joined United Riccione.

International career
Mokulu played two matches, in 2010, in Belgium U21.

He also has a cap in  DR Congo national team having made his debut against Gabon in 2011.

Honours
Lokeren
Belgian Cup: 2011–12

References

External links
 News on Benjamin Mokulu Tembe
 
 
 

1989 births
Living people
Belgian people of Democratic Republic of the Congo descent
Footballers from Brussels
Democratic Republic of the Congo footballers
Belgian footballers
Association football forwards
Challenger Pro League players
Belgian Pro League players
R.W.D.M. Brussels F.C. players
Royale Union Saint-Gilloise players
K.V. Oostende players
K.S.C. Lokeren Oost-Vlaanderen players
K.V. Mechelen players
Ligue 1 players
SC Bastia players
Serie B players
Serie C players
Serie D players
U.S. Avellino 1912 players
Frosinone Calcio players
U.S. Cremonese players
A.C. Carpi players
Juventus Next Gen players
Calcio Padova players
Ravenna F.C. players
FC Swift Hesperange players
A.S.D. Riccione 1929 players
Belgian expatriate footballers
Democratic Republic of the Congo expatriate footballers
Belgian expatriate sportspeople in France
Democratic Republic of the Congo expatriate sportspeople in Italy
Expatriate footballers in France
Expatriate footballers in Italy
Belgium under-21 international footballers
Democratic Republic of the Congo international footballers
Doping cases in association football